The Heat Death of the Universe is the first full-length album by New York City-based hardcore punk band Off Minor, released on January 28, 2003. The album was released in Germany through EarthSkyWater Connection (who also helped distribute the band's music in Europe) and Clean Plate Records issued the album in the United States.

In 2010, the record was named as the 84th best album released in the 2000s by Sputnikmusic.

Track listing

Personnel
Jamie Behar – vocals, guitar
Steven Roche – vocals, drums, recording
Kevin Roche – bass guitar, photography, design
Joe Eubanks - typography
Stan Wright - assistant recording

References

2003 debut albums
Off Minor albums